Veronika Jean Bozeman (born January 9, 1988) is an American singer and actress best known for her recurring role as Veronica in the Fox primetime musical drama television series Empire. Bozeman began her career vocal producing songs such as "Lay It Down" by Lloyd in 2011.

Early life 
Bozeman was born and raised in the South region of Los Angeles, California. She attended Crenshaw High School and California State University, Long Beach. She had the dream of being a singer since early childhood.

Career 
Bozeman is currently under the label Mosley Music Group. She has previously been featured in music by Timbaland, CeeLo Green, Timothy Bloom, and Rihanna. Her manager is Monica Payne, formerly of the short-lived new jack swing groups The Gyrlz and Terri & Monica.

Bozeman performed "What is Love" on the pilot of the hit show Empire. The show's debut soundtrack album peaked at number one on the Billboard 200 chart in the United States. The music video of the song garnered more than 100 million views on YouTube.

Bozeman appeared as the love interest of Raheem DeVaughn in his 2019 music video "Just Right".

Discography

Studio album 

 Music Is My Boyfriend (TBA)

Singles

As lead artist

As featured artist

Other Song
 2015 : Hourglass (prod by Max Beesley & Terrence Howard)

Filmography
 2010 : The Blue Wall: Kendra (short)
 2015–2019 : Empire: Veronica (recurring role, 7 episodes)
 2016 : The Black Book: herself (short – starring Tyrese & Tank)
 2016 : 90 Days: Samantha (short – starring Teyonah Parris – Jennia Fredrique)
 2016 : Boy Bye: Melanie (starring Shondrella Avery – starring Tammy Townsend and Omar Gooding)
 2017 : Versus (short – starring Jesse Williams)
 2019 : Sacrifice: Tamika
 2020 : Paydirt: Cici

References

External links 
 
 
 
 

Living people
20th-century African-American women singers
African-American actresses
American television actresses
1988 births
21st-century American women singers
Crenshaw High School alumni
California State University, Long Beach alumni
21st-century African-American women singers